Marianne Cope, TOSF, also known as Saint Marianne of Molokai (January 23, 1838 – August 9, 1918), was a German-born American religious sister who was a member of the Sisters of St Francis of Syracuse, New York, and founding leader of its St. Joseph's Hospital in the city, among the first of 50 general hospitals in the country. Known also for her charitable works, in 1883 she relocated with six other sisters to Hawaiʻi to care for persons suffering leprosy on the island of Molokaʻi and aid in developing the medical infrastructure in Hawaiʻi. Despite direct contact with the patients over many years, Cope did not contract the disease.

In 2005, Cope was beatified by Pope Benedict XVI. Cope was declared a saint by the same pope on October 21, 2012, along with Kateri Tekakwitha, a 17th-century Native American. Cope is the 11th person in what is now the United States to be canonized by the Catholic Church.

Life

Birth and vocation
Cope was baptized Barbara Koob, later anglicizing her last name to "Cope". She was born on January 23, 1838, in Heppenheim in the Grand Duchy of Hesse to Peter Koob (1787–1862) and Barbara Witzenbacher (1803–1872). The following year her family emigrated to the United States, settling in the industrial city of Utica, New York. They became members of the Parish of St Joseph, where Cope attended  parish school. By the time she was in eighth grade, her father had developed a disability. As the oldest child, Cope left school to work in a textile factory to support her family. Cope, her father, and her siblings became naturalized as an American citizens in the 1850s.

Cope received her First Holy Communion and her Confirmation at Historic Old St. Johns Church in Utica, New York.

By the time their father, Peter Cope, died in 1862, the younger children in the family were of age to support themselves, so Barbara pursued her long-felt religious calling. She entered the novitiate of the Sisters of the Third Order Regular of Saint Francis in Syracuse, New York. After a year of formation, Cope received the religious habit of the Franciscan Sisters and the new name Marianne. She became first a teacher and then a principal in newly established schools for the region's German-speaking immigrants. Following the revolutions of 1848, more German Catholic immigrants entered the United States. 

By 1870, Cope had become a member of the governing council of her religious congregation. She helped found the first two Catholic hospitals in Central New York, with charters stipulating that medical care was to be provided to all, regardless of race or creed. She was appointed by the Superior General to govern St. Joseph's Hospital, the first public hospital in Syracuse, serving from 1870 to 1877.

As a hospital administrator, Cope became involved with the move of Geneva Medical College of Hobart College from Geneva, New York, to Syracuse, where it became the College of Medicine at Syracuse University. She contracted with the college to accept their students for treating patients in her hospital to further their medical education. Her stipulation in the contract—again unique for the period—was the right of the patients to refuse care by the students. These experiences helped prepare her for the special ministry she next pursued.

Call to Hawaii
In 1883, Cope, by then Superior General of the congregation, received a plea for help from King Kalākaua of Hawaii to care for leprosy sufferers. More than 50 religious congregations had already declined his request for Sisters to do this because leprosy was considered to be highly contagious. She responded enthusiastically to the letter:

I am hungry for the work and I wish with all my heart to be one of the chosen Ones, whose privilege it will be, to sacrifice themselves for the salvation of the souls of the poor Islanders... I am not afraid of any disease, hence it would be my greatest delight even to minister to the abandoned 'lepers.'

Cope departed from Syracuse with six other Sisters to travel to Honolulu to answer this call, arriving on November 8, 1883. They traveled on the SS Mariposa. With Mother Marianne as a supervisor, the Sisters' task was to manage Kakaako Branch Hospital on Oahu, which served as a receiving station for Hansen's disease patients gathered from all over the islands. The more severe cases were processed and shipped to the island of Molokai for confinement in the settlement at Kalawao, and then later at Kalaupapa.

The following year, at the government's request, Cope set up Malulani Hospital, the first general hospital on the island of Maui. Soon, she was called back to the hospital in Oahu. She had to deal with a government-appointed administrator's abuse of the leprosy patients at the Branch Hospital at Kakaako, an area adjoining Honolulu. She told the government that either the administrator had to be dismissed or the Sisters would return to Syracuse. She was given charge of the overcrowded hospital. Her return to Syracuse to re-assume governance of the congregation was delayed, as both the government and church authorities thought she was essential to the mission's success.

Two years later, the king awarded Cope with the Cross of a Companion of the Royal Order of Kapiolani for her care of his people. The work continued to increase. In November 1885, Cope opened the Kapiolani Home with the government's support to provide shelter to homeless female children of leprosy patients. The home was located on a leprosy hospital's grounds because only the Sisters were willing to care for children so closely associated with people suffering from leprosy.

In 1887, a new government came into office. It ended the forced exile of leprosy patients to Molokai and closed the specialty hospital in Oahu. A year later, the authorities pleaded with Cope to establish a new home for women and girls on the Kalaupapa peninsula of Molokai. She accepted the call, knowing that it might mean she would never return to New York. "We will cheerfully accept the work…" was her response.

Molokai

In November 1888, Cope moved to Kalaupapa. She cared for the dying Father Damien, SS.CC., who was already known internationally for his work in the leper colony and began to take over his burdens. She had met him shortly after her arrival in Hawaii.

When Father Damien died on April 15, 1889, the government officially gave Cope a charge for the care of the boys of Kalaupapa and her current role in caring for the colony's female residents. A prominent local businessman, Henry Perrine Baldwin, donated money for the new home. Cope and two assistants, Sister Leopoldina Burns and Sister Vincentia McCormick, opened and ran a new girls' school, which she named in Baldwin's honor. A community of Religious Brothers was sought to come and care for the boys. After the arrival of four Brothers of the Sacred Heart in 1895, Cope withdrew the Sisters to the Bishop Home for leprous women and girls. Joseph Dutton was given charge of Baldwin House by the government.

Death
Cope died on August 9, 1918, due to natural causes. She was buried on the grounds of the Bishop Home. In 2005, her remains were brought to Syracuse for reinterment at her motherhouse. In 2014, her remains were returned to Honolulu and are enshrined at the Cathedral Basilica of Our Lady of Peace.

Legacy and honors
 1927 — Saint Francis Hospital was founded in Honolulu in her memory as a community hospital and trained nurses to work with Hansen's disease patients.
 1957 — St. Francis opened the Child Development Center at the Honolulu Community Church.
 1962 — St. Francis Home Care Services was established, the first in Hawaii to specialize in home health care for Hawaiian people.
 2005, Induction into the National Women's Hall of Fame.
 2006 — The Sisters of St. Francis chose to focus on long-term care, transferring St. Francis Hospital's two facilities to a private board. The facilities are now known as the Hawaii Medical Center East in Liliha, and Hawaii Medical Center West in Ewa. Both hospitals were closed at the end of 2011. In August 2012, The Queen's Health Systems agreed to acquire the former Hawaii Medical Center West and reopen the hospital in the fall of 2013.
The Saint Francis School was founded in Cope's honor in 1924, operating as a girls-only school for grades 6–9.

The community which Cope founded on Molokai continues to minister to the few patients who have Hansen Disease. The Franciscan Sisters work at several schools and minister to parishioners throughout the Hawaiian Islands.

Beatification
In 1993, Katherine Dehlia Mahoney was allegedly healed from multiple-organ failure after praying to Marianne Cope for intercession. On October 24, 2003, the Congregation for the Causes of Saints declared Cope to have been "heroically virtuous." On April 19, 2004, Pope John Paul II issued a papal decree declaring her Venerable. On December 20, 2004, after receiving the unanimous affirmation of the Congregation of the Causes of Saints, Pope John Paul II ordered a decree to be issued authenticating this recovery as a miracle to be attributed to the intercession of Cope. On May 14, 2005, Cope was beatified in Vatican City by Pope Benedict XVI in his first beatification ceremony.
Over 100 followers from Hawaii attended the beatification ceremony, along with 300 members of Cope's religious congregation in Syracuse. At the ceremony, presided over by Cardinal José Saraiva Martins, C.M.F., the Hawaiian song "Makalapua" (a favorite of Cope) was sung. Her feast day was established as January 23 and is celebrated by her own religious congregation, the Diocese of Honolulu, and the Diocese of Syracuse.

After the announcement by the Holy See of her impending beatification, during January 2005, Cope's remains were moved to the motherhouse of the congregation in Syracuse. A temporary shrine was established to honor her. By 2009, the erection of a marble sarcophagus in the motherhouse chapel was complete. Her remains were interred in the new shrine on her feast day of January 23.

In 2007, a statue of her was erected at St Joseph's Church in her native Utica, whose parish school she had attended in her childhood.

Canonization
On December 6, 2011, the Congregation for the Causes of Saints found that a second miracle could also be attributed to the intercession of Cope. This finding was forwarded to Pope Benedict XVI by its secretary, Cardinal Angelo Amato, for papal approval. On December 19, 2011, Pope Benedict signed and approved the promulgation of the decree for Cope's sainthood and she was canonized on October 21, 2012; a relic was carried to Honolulu from her mother church. Dr. Waldery Hilgeman was the Postulator of the Cause of Canonization.

After Father Damien, Cope is the second person to be canonized who had served in the Hawaiian Islands. She was both the first Beatification and the last Canonisation under Pope Benedict XVI. In 2014, the church announced that Saint Marianne's remains would be re-interred at the Cathedral of Our Lady of Peace in Honolulu, which was undergoing an extensive renovation. This is a more convenient location for the faithful than the Kalaupapa National Historical Park on Molokai, where access is primarily by plane or mule train. She sometimes attended Mass at the cathedral, and it was where Father Damien was ordained. In New York, the Franciscan Convent which held her remains, moved to a new location because its former buildings needed extensive repairs.

Ecumenical veneration
Cope is honored jointly with Saint Damien of Moloka'i on the liturgical calendar of the Episcopal Church (USA). Their shared feast day is celebrated on April 15.

In arts and media
Paul Cox directed the film Molokai: The Story of Father Damien (1999). Cope was portrayed by South African actress Alice Krige. Father Damien was portrayed by David Wenham.

See also
 List of American saints and beatified people

References

Further reading

External links

 
 
 
 Saint Marianne Cope Shrine and Museum https://saintmariannecope.org 
 A Place of Care: Mother Marianne Cope and the Kalaupapa Cultural Landscape (U.S. National Park Service)
 Saint Marianne - Roman Catholic Church in the State of Hawaii

1838 births
1918 deaths
People from Bergstraße (district)
Hessian emigrants to the United States
People from Utica, New York
Third Order Regular Franciscans
19th-century American Roman Catholic nuns
American nurses
American women nurses
Roman Catholic missionaries in Hawaii
Roman Catholic Diocese of Honolulu
American Roman Catholic missionaries
Female Roman Catholic missionaries
Franciscan missionaries
People from Molokai
Recipients of the Royal Order of Kapiolani
Burials in Hawaii
Burials in New York (state)
Beatifications by Pope Benedict XVI
American Roman Catholic saints
Franciscan saints
19th-century Christian saints
20th-century Christian saints
Leprosy nurses and caregivers
Christian female saints of the Late Modern era
Canonizations by Pope Benedict XVI
Venerated Catholics by Pope John Paul II
People from Kalawao County, Hawaii
Catholics from New York (state)
Catholics from Hawaii
Educators from New York (state)
American women educators
20th-century American Roman Catholic nuns